is a live video by Japanese singer/songwriter Chisato Moritaka. Recorded live at the Shibuya Public Hall in Shibuya, Tokyo on August 22, 1991, the video was released on July 26, 2017 by Warner Music Japan on Blu-ray and DVD formats; each with a two-disc audio CD version of the concert. A limited edition Blu-ray box set includes The Moritaka in Ultimate High Quality CD (UHQCD) and double-LP formats. The video was released to commemorate Moritaka's 30th anniversary in the music industry.

The video peaked at No. 28 on Oricon's Blu-ray chart and at No. 80 on Oricon's DVD chart.

Track listing 
Blu-ray/DVD

CD

Personnel 
 Chisato Moritaka – vocals
 Yasuaki Maejima – keyboards
 Shin Kōno – keyboards
 Hiroyoshi Matsuo – guitar
 Masafumi Yokoyama – bass
 Makoto Yoshiwara – drums

Charts

References

External links 
  (Chisato Moritaka)
  (Warner Music Japan)
 

2017 live albums
2017 video albums
Chisato Moritaka video albums
Japanese-language live albums
Japanese-language video albums
Live video albums
Warner Music Japan albums